Petre Lucian Goge (born 29 September 1991 in Poiana Mare), also known as Petre Goge or Lucian Goge, is a Romanian footballer who plays for Liga II club Metaloglobus București. Mainly a left back, he can also play as a left midfielder.

Career statistics

Club

Honours
Rapid București
Liga III: 2018–19
Liga IV – Bucharest: 2017–18

References

External links
 
 
 
 Petre Goge at ACSPoliTimisoara.MyForum.ro 

1991 births
Living people
Romanian footballers
SCM Râmnicu Vâlcea players
FC Unirea Urziceni players
ASA 2013 Târgu Mureș players
ACS Poli Timișoara players
ASC Daco-Getica București players
FC Politehnica Iași (2010) players
FC Brașov (1936) players
CS Luceafărul Oradea players
FC Rapid București players
CS Concordia Chiajna players
FC Metaloglobus București players
Liga I players
Liga II players
Association football midfielders